FabricLive.45 is a 2009 album by A-Trak. The album was released as part of the FabricLive Mix Series.

Track listing
"Say Whoa"  A-Trak Fool's Gold Records / "You can't Hide from your Bud  DJ Sneak  Classic
"Oh! Boys Noize -(A-Trak Remix) – Boysnoize Records
"Mothership Reconnection (Daft Punk Remix)" Scott Grooves ft. Parliament Funkadelic – – Soma
"Get on Down" by Voodoo Chilli, licensed from Cheap Thrills
Sweet Mother (House Version)  Skepta Boy Better Know 
 I'm the Ish DJ Class -- Unruly
Heartbreaker (Diskjokke Remix) Metronomy licensed from Becausey 
Peep Thong His Majesty Andre – – Cheap Thrills
"Forza (Original)" by Zombie Nation  UKW
Aurora  Alex Gopher  Go 4 Music
Dance Area – AA 24-7 – Phantasy
Robbie Rivera – Move Move (DJ Observer & Daniel Heathcliff Remix) – Juicy
Daniele Papini – Church of Nonsense – Media
Laidback Luke & A-Trak – Shake it Down – Fool's Gold
Nacho Lovers – Acid Life (Nachos 909 Dub) – Fool's Gold
Rob Threezy – The Chase – Rob Threezy
Friendly Fires – Paris (Aeroplane Remix) – XL
Fan Death – Veronica's Veil (Erol Alkan's Extended Rework) – Phantasy
Infant Presents Simon Baker – Plastik (Todd Terje's Turkatech Remix) – Playhouse
The Martian – Tobacco Ties – Red Planet
DJ Gant-Man – Juke dat Girl – Fool's Gold
DJ MP4 – The Book is on the Table – Music Nets
Jamie Anderson & Content – Body Jackin' – International DeeJay Gigolo Records
Raffertie – Do Dat – On the Brink
DJ Zinc – 138 Trek – Bingo Beats

Reception
In a review for AllMusic, Dave Shim proclaims that "A-Trak has released a mix tailor made for dance floor enthusiasts rather than fader-flicking musos." FabricLive.45 brings together older club styles with newer club beats "seamlessly mashed up in jaw-dropping new configurations".

References

External links
Fabric: FabricLive.45

Fabric (club) albums
A-Trak albums
2009 compilation albums